Mohamed Abdelhak Achik (born February 1, 1965) is a former Moroccan amateur boxer who won a bronze medal in the men's bantamweight (54 kg) category at the 1992 Summer Olympics in Barcelona.

1992 Olympic results 
Below are the results of Mohammed Achik, a Moroccan bantamweight boxer who competed at the 1992 Barcelona Olympics:

Round of 32: Defeated Dieter Berg (Germany) on points, 3-0
Round of 16: Defeated Slimane Zengli (Algeria) on points, 12-8
Quarterfinal: Defeated Remigio Molina (Argentina) on points, 15-5
Semifinal: Lost to Joel Casamayor (Cuba) by a TKO at 2:33 of the first round (was awarded bronze medal)

External links
Mohamed Achik Profile

1965 births
Living people
Bantamweight boxers
Boxers at the 1988 Summer Olympics
Boxers at the 1992 Summer Olympics
Boxers at the 1996 Summer Olympics
Olympic bronze medalists for Morocco
Olympic boxers of Morocco
Olympic medalists in boxing
Moroccan male boxers
Medalists at the 1992 Summer Olympics
21st-century Moroccan people
20th-century Moroccan people